Mohamed Mezouari, better known as Hamicha, is a Moroccan-Dutch kickboxer. He is ranked the #1 welterweight in Glory.

He is ranked as the sixth best welterweight in the world by Combat Press as of September 2022, and the eighth best by Beyond Kick as of October 2022.

Kickboxing career

Early career
Mezouari started to train kickboxing at the age of 8 on El Otmani Gym in the Netherlands, where he still training.

Mezouari fought Dzianis Zuev in the Kunlun 56 70kg tournament reserve fight. He won the fight by unanimous decision.

Mezouari fought in the Kunlun Fight Group 1 70 kg tournament. In the semifinals, he won a decision against Arman Hambaryan. In the group tournament finals, Mezouari defeated Danilo Zanolini through a first round KO.

Mezouari fought Thongchai Sitsongpeenong during Fight League 7 for the Fight League -76kg World title. Mezouari knocked Thongchai out in the second round, with a right low kick.

Afterwards, Mezouari fought Artem Pashporin. Mezouari won the fight by a first round TKO, which earned him a place in the 2017 70kg World Max Tournament Final 8. Mezouari lost a unanimous decision to Marat Grigorian in the quarterfinals.

Glory
Mezouari made his Glory debut during Glory 62, when he faced Miles Simson. He knocked Simson out in the first round. He won his second fight against Adam Hadfield at Glory 66: Paris on June 22, 2019, by a first round technical knockout.

Mezouari was expected to face Dmitry Menshikov at Glory 78: Arnhem. Menshikov later withdrew from the bout and was replaced by Vedat Hoduk. Mezouari won the fight by a first-round technical knockout.

Mezouari was expected to face Eyevan Danenberg at Glory: Collision 3 on October 23, 2021. Danenberg later withdrew from the bout and was replaced by Maximo Suarez. Suarez later withdrew a from the bout as well, and was replaced by Samo Dbili. Mezouari won the fight by a first-round technical knockout.

Titles and accomplishments
 2017 Fight League -76kg World Champion
 2016 BLADE -70kg Champion

Fight record

|- style="background:#cfc;"
| 2021-10-23 || Win ||align=left|  Samuel Dbili || Glory: Collision 3 || Arnhem, Netherlands || TKO (3 Knockdowns/body punch) ||  1 || 2:28
|-  style="background:#cfc;"
| 2021-09-04 || Win ||align=left| Vedat Hoduk || Glory 78: Arnhem || Arnhem, Netherlands || TKO (Punch to the body)  || 1 || 1:20

|-  style="background:#cfc;"
| 2019-06-22 || Win ||align=left| Adam Hadfield || Glory 66: Paris || Paris, France || TKO (Left body shot)  || 1 || 1:35

|-  style="background:#cfc;"
| 2018-12-08|| Win ||align=left| Miles Simson || Glory 62: Rotterdam || Rotterdam, Netherlands || KO (Head kick) || 1 || 1:53
|-
|-  style="background:#fbb;"
| 2017-11-12 || Loss ||align=left| Marat Grigorian || Kunlun Fight 67 - World MAX 2017 Final 8 || Sanya, China || Decision (Unanimous) || 3 || 3:00
|-  style="background:#cfc;"
| 2017-08-27 || Win ||align=left| Artem Pashporin || Kunlun Fight 65 - World MAX 2017 Final 16 || Qingdao, China || TKO (3 Knockdowns Rule) || 1 || 2:28
|-
! style=background:white colspan=9 |
|-
|-  style="background:#cfc;"
| 2017-08-05 || Win ||align=left| Thongchai Sitsongpeenong || Fight League 7 || Tangier, Morocco || KO (Right low kick) || 2 || 1:15
|-
! style=background:white colspan=9 |Won Fight League -76kg World Title.
|-
|-  style="background:#cfc;"
| 2017-02-26 || Win ||align=left| Danilo Zanolini || Kunlun Fight 57 - World MAX 2017 Group 1 Tournament Final  || Sanya, China || KO (Left body kick) || 1 || 0:21
|-
! style=background:white colspan=9 | 
|-
|-  style="background:#cfc;"
| 2017-02-26 || Win ||align=left| Arman Hambaryan || Kunlun Fight 57 - World MAX 2017 Group 1 Tournament Semi Finals  || Sanya, China || Decision (Unanimous) || 3 || 3:00
|-
|-  style="background:#cfc;"
| 2017-01-01 || Win||align=left| Dzianis Zuev || | Kunlun Fight 56 – 70 kg 2016 Tournament Reserve Fight  || Sanya, China || Decision (Unanimous) || 3 || 3:00
|-
|-  style="background:#cfc;"
| 2016-08-28|| Win ||align=left| Arthit Hanchana || Super Muaythai - Kunlun Fight World MAX 2016 Final 16 || Bangkok, Thailand || Decision (Unanimous) || 3 || 3:00
|-
! style=background:white colspan=9 |
|-  style="background:#cfc;"
| 2016-08-07|| Win ||align=left| David Ruiz || Kunlun Fight 49 / Rebels 45|| Tokyo, Japan || KO (Head kick) || 2 || 1:25
|-
! style=background:white colspan=9 |Won BLADE -70kg Title.
|-
|-  style="background:#Fbb;"
| 2016-04-23 || Loss ||align=left| Sitthichai Sitsongpeenong || Kunlun Fight 43 – World MAX 2016 Group I Tournament Final || Zhoukou, China || Ext. R Decision (Split) || 4 || 3:00
|-
|-  style="background:#cfc;"
| 2016-04-23 || Win ||align=left| Yussef Boulahtari || Kunlun Fight 43 – World MAX 2016 Group I Tournament Semi Finals || Zhoukou, China || KO (Right cross)  || 1 || 2:30
|-
|-  style="background:#cfc;"
| 2016-04-02 || Win||align=left| Abdel Fak ||  Enfusion Live Gold Edition || Netherlands ||TKO || 2 ||
|-
|-  style="background:#cfc;"
| 2016-03-09 || Win||align=left| Hinata Watanabe || Rebels. 41 || Tokyo, Japan || Decision (Unanimous) || 3 || 3:00
|-
|-  style="background:#cfc;"
| 2016-01-23|| Win||align=left| Brown Pinas || Sportmani Events VIII || Amsterdam, Netherlands || Decision (Unanimous) || 3 || 3:00
|-
|-  style="background:#cfc;"
| 2015-12-06 || Win||align=left| Brahim Kallah || Real Fighters AN2R || Netherlands || KO (Right hook) || 2 || 0:25
|-
|-  style="background:#cfc;"
| 2015-10-31|| Win||align=left| Nikos Papadimitriou|| Scorpion X-Treme Stores || Greece || Decision (Majority) || 3 || 3:00
|-
|-  style="background:#Fbb;"
| 2015-05-16|| Loss ||align=left| Vedat Hoduk  || A1 World Combat Cup Platinium || Eindhoven, Netherlands || Decision || 3 || 3:00
|-
|-  style="background:#cfc;"
| 2015-02-07|| Win||align=left| Melvin Wassing || Enfusion Live || Netherlands || KO || 1 ||
|-
|-  style="background:#cfc;"
| 2014-20-09|| Win||align=left| Sem Aipassa || A1 World Combat Cup || United Kingdom || KO || 1 || 00:25
|-
|-  style="background:#cfc;"
| 2014-03-30|| Win||align=left| Luke Whelan || Chok Muay || Netherlands || Decision|| 3 || 3:00
|-
|-  style="background:#cfc;"
| 2014-03-15|| Win||align=left| Chakir Abdelaoui || Fight For Victory V|| Netherlands || Decision|| 5 || 3:00
|-
|-  style="background:#cfc;"
| 2014-02-22|| Win||align=left| Oussama Attadlaoui || Enfusion Live || Netherlands || KO ||  ||
|-
|-  style="background:#cfc;"
| 2013-12-01|| Win||align=left| Craig Jose || Masac Masters || United Kingdom || Decision|| 3 || 3:00
|-
|-  style="background:#cfc;"
| 2013-09-22|| Win||align=left| Joost Mulder || Students of the Game || Netherlands || Decision|| 3 || 3:00
|-
| colspan=9 | Legend:

See also
List of male kickboxers

External links
Profile at Glory

References

Living people
1996 births 
Dutch male kickboxers
Moroccan male kickboxers
Kunlun Fight kickboxers